Francisco Arado de Armas (born 30 December 1971) is a Brazilian-Cuban table tennis player. He competed in the men's singles event at the 2000 Summer Olympics.

References

1971 births
Living people
Cuban male table tennis players
Olympic table tennis players of Cuba
Table tennis players at the 2000 Summer Olympics
Place of birth missing (living people)
Pan American Games medalists in table tennis
Pan American Games silver medalists for Cuba
Pan American Games bronze medalists for Cuba
Table tennis players at the 1995 Pan American Games
Table tennis players at the 1999 Pan American Games
Medalists at the 1995 Pan American Games
Medalists at the 1999 Pan American Games
20th-century Cuban people